Protein FAM25 is a protein that in humans is encoded by the FAM25BP gene.

References